Events from the year 1933 in art.

Events
 January 12 – George Grosz emigrates from Nazi Germany to the United States.
 February/March – Käthe Kollwitz is forced by the Nazi Party in Germany to resign from the faculty of the Academy of Arts, Berlin.
 April
 Closure of the Bauhaus.
 Freddy Mayor opens a gallery in Cork Street, London, specialising in modernism.
 May – The mural Man at the Crossroads by Diego Rivera at the Rockefeller Center in New York is covered up because it contains a portrait of Lenin. While Rivera has been working on it, he has been joined in the United States by Frieda Kahlo who begins her painting My Dress Hangs There.
 June 12 – Paul Nash, in a letter to The Times of London, announces formation of the group Unit One by young British artists to promote modernism in Britain.
 July – New Midland Hotel, Morecambe, on the Lancashire coast of England, designed by Oliver Hill, is opened incorporating sculpture by Eric Gill and murals by Eric Ravilious and Edward Bawden.
 September/October – "Henri Cartier-Bresson and an Exhibition of Anti-Graphic Photography" staged at Julien Levy's gallery in New York City.
 September – Artists Union formed in the United States as the Emergency Work Bureau Artists Group.
 December 12 – Scholars of the Warburg Institute in Hamburg resolve to relocate from Nazi Germany to London.
 Black Mountain College founded by John Andrew Rice.
 Hans Bellmer produces his first Doll sculpture.
 Barbara Hepworth and John Skeaping are divorced; Hepworth is already in a relationship with Ben Nicholson.
 Kenneth Clark appointed Director of the National Gallery, London, at age 30, taking up his post in January 1934.

Works

 Jean Arp – Head and Shell (bronze)
 Gutzon Borglum – Statue of Harvey W. Scott (bronze, Portland, Oregon)
 Bill Brandt – Parlourmaid and Under-Parlourmaid Ready to Serve Dinner (documentary photograph)
 Tarsila do Amaral – Operarios
 Jacob Epstein
 Man of Aran (portrait bust of 'Tiger' King)
 Primeval Gods / Sun God (double-sided Hoptonwood stone carving)
 Portrait busts of Lord Beaverbrook, Prof. Albert Einstein, Robert Flaherty, John Gielgud and Dr Chaim Weizmann
 James Gunn – Eleanor Rathbone
 C. Paul Jennewein
 Spirit of Justice (sculpture, Department of Justice Building, Washington, D.C.)
 Western Civilization (pediment sculpture, Philadelphia Museum of Art)
 Frieda Kahlo
 My Dress Hangs There (Allá cuelga mi vestido)
 Self-portrait – Very Ugly (Autorretrato – muy fea)
 André Kertész – Distortions (photographs)
 René Magritte – The Human Condition (first version)
 Tom Monnington – Admiral of the Fleet Sir John Jellicoe
 Hilda Rix Nicholas – The Summer House (approximate date)
 Pablo Picasso – Minotaur Kneeling over Sleeping Girl (etching)
 Gabriel Pippet – mosaic interior decoration, Church of the Sacred Heart and St Catherine of Alexandria, Droitwich Spa, England (completed)
 Diego Rivera
 Detroit Industry Murals (frescoes for Detroit Institute of Arts)
 Man at the Crossroads (mural, original version for Rockefeller Center, New York, destroyed)
 Percy Shakespeare
 Mephistopheles
 A Mulatto
 John Skeaping – Horse (sculpture in mahogany and pynkado, originally in Whipsnade Zoo; later in Tate Gallery)
 Carel Willink – The Zeppelin

Awards
 Archibald Prize: Charles Wheeler – Ambrose Pratt

Births

January to June
 February 8 – Richard Allen, British abstract minimalist Op, Pop, Geometric painter and printmaker (d. 1999)
 February 18 – Yoko Ono, Japanese-born sculptor, filmmaker, installation artist and musician
 February 22 – Joseph Raffael, painter
 February 27 
Ansgar Elde, Swedish ceramic artist (d. 2000)
Edward Lucie-Smith, British art critic and poet
 March 4 – John W. Mills, English sculptor
 March 10 – Abdul Hay Mosallam Zarara, Palestinian artist (d. 2020)
 March 17 – Stass Paraskos, Greek Cypriot painter (d. 2014)
 April 1 – Dan Flavin, American minimalist artist (d. 1996)
 April 9 – René Burri, Swiss photographer (d. 2014)
 April 15 – David Hamilton, English photographer (d. 2016)
 April 23 – Roger Wittevrongel, Belgian artist
 April 29 – Alison Knowles, American Fluxus performance artist, sound artist, papermaker and printmaker
 June 11 – Harald Szeemann, Swiss curator and art historian (d. 2005)
 June 12 – Eddie Adams, American Pulitzer Prize-winning photographer (d. 2004)
 June 23 
Michelangelo Pistoletto, Italian object artist, action painter and art theorist
 Hermenegildo Sábat, Uruguayan-Argentine caricaturist (d. 2018)

July to December
 8 July – Jeff Nuttall, English poet, publisher, actor, painter and sculptor (d. 2004)
 18 July – Cécile Guillame, first woman to engrave French postal stamps (d. 2004)
 21 July – Laila Pullinen, Finnish sculptor (d. 2015)
 18 August – Michael Baxandall, Welsh art historian (d. 2008)
 August 29 – Sorel Etrog, Romanian-born Canadian sculptor, writer and philosopher (d. 2014)
 September 18 – Mark di Suvero, Chinese-born Italian American abstract expressionist sculptor
 September 30 – Ilya Kabakov, Soviet-born conceptual artist
 October 9 – Bill Tidy, British cartoonist and illustrator (d. 2023)
 October 28 – Michael Noakes, English portrait painter
 October 29 – Sydney Ball, Australian abstract painter (d. 2017)
 November 8 – Lothar Fischer, German sculptor (d. 2004)
 November 18
 Bruce Conner, American artist in experimental film, drawing, sculpture, painting, collage and photography (d. 2008)
 Charlotte Moorman, American Fluxus performance artist (d. 1991)
 November 29 – James Rosenquist, American painter and muralist (d. 2017)
 November 30 – Sam Gilliam, American painter
 December 14 – Bapu, Indian film director, cartoonist and painter (d. 2014)

Full date of birth unknown
 John Stuart Ingle, American realist watercolorist (d. 2010)

Deaths
 January 10 – Margaret Macdonald Mackintosh, Scottish designer (b. 1865)
 January 17 – Louis Comfort Tiffany, American stained glass artist (b. 1848)
 February 3 – Anne de Rochechouart de Mortemart, Duchesse d'Uzès, French patron and sculptor (b. 1847) 
 February 28 – Lilla Cabot Perry, American Impressionist painter (b. 1848)
 March 9 –  Joakim Skovgaard, Danish painter (b. 1856)
 March 10 –  Émile André, French architect and designer (b. 1871)
 April 16 – Harold Peto, English architect and garden designer (b. 1854)
 May 6 – François Pompon, French sculptor (b. 1856)
 May 25 – James E. Kelly, American sculptor and illustrator (b. 1855)
 June 14 – Hans Prinzhorn, German art historian (b. 1886)
 August 5 – Charles Harold Davis, American landscape painter (b. 1856)
 August 8 – Adolf Loos, Austrian Modernist architect (b. 1870)
 September 27 – Zaida Ben-Yusuf, American portrait photographer (b. 1869)
 October 2 – Elizabeth Thompson, British painter (b. 1846)
 October 24 – Annie Swynnerton, English painter (b. 1844)
 October 26 – José Malhoa, Portuguese painter (b. 1855)
 October 29 – George Luks, American realist painter (b. 1867)
 November 12 – F. Holland Day, American photographer (b. 1864)
 November 14 – Thomas Hayton Mawson, English garden designer (b. 1861)
 November 15 – Émile-Jacques Ruhlmann, French furniture designer (b. 1879)
 November 19 – Louise Jopling, English painter (b. 1843)
 December 4 – W. G. R. Sprague, British theatre designer (b. 1863)
 date unknown – Susan Isabel Dacre, English painter (b. 1844)

See also
 1933 in fine arts of the Soviet Union

References

 
Years of the 20th century in art
1930s in art